The Westfort Maroons were a Junior "B" ice hockey team based in the Westfort Ward of Thunder Bay, Ontario.  They played in the Thunder Bay Junior B Hockey League from 2000 to 2006.

Season-by-season standings

 Won HNO Jr B Final against Terrace Bay, Lost in Round Robin in Maple Ridge BC (keystone Cup)
 Lost in 5 games vs Terrace Bay HNO Championship

Defunct junior ice hockey teams in Canada
Sport in Thunder Bay